The Cape York rat (Rattus leucopus) is a species of rodent in the family Muridae.
It is found in southern New Guinea, in both Indonesia and Papua New Guinea, and in Cape York Peninsula in Australia.

References

Rattus
Mammals of Queensland
Mammals described in 1867
Taxonomy articles created by Polbot
Rodents of Australia
Rodents of New Guinea